Hababah (died 724), was a jarya slave singer and poet of the Caliph Yazid II.

Hababah was a slave, brought to the harem of the Caliph Yazid II as a concubine. She entertained him as a singer and a poet. Yazid became so much in love with her that he was described as hypnotized by her singing and poetry.

The chronicles state: 
'One day while Hababa was singing, Yazid experienced such great pleasure that he burst out: "I want to fly away!" 
Hababa told him: "Commander of the Faithful, if you leave the umma and also us, who will take care of us?'"

She died after choking on pomegranate seeds, (according to another account it was grapes thrown at her by the Caliph) while picnicking in a garden. Yazid initially refused to bury her and was so affected by her death he refused to see anyone for a week. He neglected his duties and died not long after. To his enemies Yazid's great love for her and sorrow at her death resulted in his name coming in disrepute for centuries before he was rehabilitated, and his neglect of state affairs caused Hababah to be considered as an enemy of God.

References

724 deaths

Year of birth unknown
8th-century women
8th-century Arabic poets
8th-century people from the Umayyad Caliphate
8th-century women musicians
Arabian slaves and freedmen
Slave concubines
Women poets from the Umayyad Caliphate
Slaves from the Umayyad Caliphate
Qiyan